HSwMS Oscar II was a coastal defence ship or  ("armoured ship") of the Swedish Navy. The vessel had a long career lasting over sixty years. A development of the preceding , the ship mounted a powerful armament on a small hull, which necessitated sacrificing speed and endurance. This design decision allowed Oscar II to match the firepower of contemporary armoured cruisers while still carrying the armour of a battleship.

Commissioned on 3 April 1907, Oscar II served as the flagship of the Swedish Navy, with duties including transporting Swedish King Gustav V and his consort Queen Victoria to summits with Emperors Wilhelm II of Germany and Nicholas II of Russia. During the First World War, the ship supported the Swedish invasion of Åland from February to April 1918. At the end of the conflict, the vessel was decommissioned and only returned to service in September 1929. After being modernised and serving neutral Sweden during the Second World War, the vessel was once again called upon to transport royalty, in this case bringing the body of Prince Gustaf Adolf, Duke of Västerbotten, home from Denmark after the air crash of 26 January 1947. Decommissioned on 24 February 1950, Oscar II served as a training hulk until 11 September 1974, the last of several Swedish coastal defence ships to be scrapped.

Design

Sweden appointed a commission in 1901 to analyse the state of naval defence and see what future ships were required to meet the country's needs. The commission looked at developments in other countries, particularly the escalating Anglo-German naval arms race, and decided that instead of creating a battleship similar to those being constructed abroad, a smaller vessel that relied on speed and the ability to exploit the tactical advantages of the Swedish archipelago would be more appropriate.

The commission proposed three alternatives:

Despite the commission's preference for the cheapest option, the Swedish Parliament (the Riksdag) voted for the third solution on the recommendation of Louis Palander, the Naval Secretary.

General characteristics and machinery
The ship was designed to have a normal complement of 326 officers and ratings. A command staff of nine officers could also be carried.

The ship was powered by a pair of four-cylinder triple expansion steam engines built by Motala Verkstad, each driving a three-bladed screw. The vessel was the only three-funnelled coastal defence ship in Swedish service.

Armament and armour
The main battery consisted of two Bofors  K/44 M98 guns mounted in single turrets fore and aft on the centreline. Designed in 1898, they were similar to the guns carried by the earlier Äran class. For secondary armament, the ship used the  K/50 M03 gun also provided by Bofors that had previously been used on the armoured cruiser . Eight were mounted in pairs in four turrets amidships, two on either side of the superstructure. These weapons were supplemented by ten  M/98B guns manufactured by Finspång, five mounted singly on each side of the bridge. Three  Bofors M/98 guns were carried ready to be mounted on the ship's boats for fire support if they were being used to transport landing parties. Two tubes for  torpedoes were fitted below the waterline.

The armour for Oscar II was an improvement on that of the Äran class, particularly expanding the protection to lower decks. The ship was equipped with a -long armoured belt that was provided by Schneider-Creusot.

The ship was first modernised in 1910 when a tripod mast was fitted, and other minor upgrades took place over the ship's life, including fitting new high angle mounts for two of the 57 mm guns for anti-aircraft defence in 1916. A more substantial upgrade took place in 1939. The boilers were replaced and the forward two fitted for oil firing. More space was made available for fire control by removing the torpedo tubes, which was used to fit a new fire-control system with a new director and sonar. At the same time, the 57 mm mounts were removed and replaced by an anti-aircraft battery provided by Bofors consisting of four 57 mm M/38 guns, two  M/32 guns and four  M/36 machine guns. Three searchlights and a paravane were also fitted for defence against mines.

Service

Construction work started shortly afterwards. The ship's namesake King Oscar II was to launch the vessel on 6 June 1905. However, a combination of a labour dispute and the escalating dissolution of the union between Norway and Sweden led to delays until 10 June, when the ship was launched with a non-traditional send off, as the use of champagne in the ceremony had been prohibited by Queen Sophia. It was the first time that a Swedish warship had been named after a living monarch since 1824.

Oscar II entered service as flagship of the Swedish Navy on 3 April 1907. The ship was soon showing the flag, travelling to England in the middle of the year, and then returning in time for the King to sign his name on the aft conning tower shortly before he died. The ship continued to host Swedish royalty, leaving for Saint Petersburg, Russia, on 29 April 1908 to take Prince Wilhelm, Duke of Södermanland, to marry Grand Duchess Maria Pavlovna and transporting King Gustav V to Sassnitz, Germany, on 6 July 1909 where he met Wilhelm II.

The next three years saw the ship tour the Mediterranean Sea and then subsequently visit ports in many countries including Denmark, England, Germany and the Netherlands. In the middle of 1912, the vessel carried the King and Queen Victoria of Sweden to Finland to visit Nicholas II of Russia. Shortly afterwards, the ship was briefly mobilised as flagship of the Swedish fleet in response to the First Balkan War, but swiftly returned to royal duties, providing transport for the King's visit to Christian X of Denmark in June 1913, welcoming Victor Emmanuel III of Italy in July 1913 and escorting President Raymond Poincaré of France in July 1914.

When the First World War started in that same month, the Swedish fleet was mobilised with Oscar II as flagship to protect the nation's trade routes and shipping fleet. Due to the country's neutrality in the war, the vessel spent much of the war practicing firing and damage control. However, the ship participated in the invasion of Åland in 1918, arriving on 19 February along with the newer coastal defence ship  and a contingent from the Vaxholm Coastal Artillery Regiment. Sweden had an interest in the islands, which heightened following Sweden's recognition of Finnish independence and reports of atrocities committed against the Swedish-speaking inhabitants. With Russian forces in disarray due to Russian Civil War, with both sides claiming the islands, the Swedish government saw an opportunity to occupy them. However, Germany was also interested in gaining the islands as part of a wider strategy to control the Baltic Sea and sent a substantial fleet at the same time. Oscar II was on station on 5 March when the German dreadnought battleships  and  arrived. The ship was a fundamental part of the Swedish display of force that preceded negotiations for a peaceful settlement that resulted in Germany gaining possession. The vessel was one of the last Swedish units to leave the islands, finally departing on 23 April.

Decommissioned in September 1918 in need of a complete overhaul, the ship remained out of service for the next eleven years apart from a brief period in late 1923 and early 1924.  Oscar II was brought back into service in 1929 and was mainly used for training, attached to the Royal Swedish Naval Staff College. Operations were not confined to Sweden, though, and the ship visited Portsmouth, England, in 1935.

The vessel was given a significant upgrade in the run up to the Second World War, the work being completed in November 1939. The freshly modernised ship then served as part of the Swedish Navy. During the war, the vessel was posted to Karlskrona but saw no action as Sweden once again remained neutral.

After the war, Sweden decided to retire the whole fleet of coastal defence ships. Oscar II had one last royal journey, to bring the body of Prince Gustaf Adolf, Duke of Västerbotten, home after he died in a KLM Douglas DC-3 air crash at Copenhagen Airport on 26 January 1947, before being decommissioned on 24 February 1950. The hulk was subsequently equipped with learning spaces and used for training managing leaks and radioactive contamination, including decontamination drills. Oscar II was the last coastal defence ship in the Swedish Navy, outlasting the more modern  by four years.

See also
 List of coastal defence ships of the Swedish Navy

Notes

References

Notes

Bibliography
 
 
 
 
 
 
 
 
 
 
 
 
 
 
 
 

1905 ships
Coastal defence ships of the Swedish Navy
Ships built in Gothenburg
World War II naval ships of Sweden